Actrix is an archaic synonym for actress. It may also mean:

Actrix (computer), a personal computer
Actrix (moth), a genus of moths